Dhruva is a Hindu mythological character.

Dhruva may also refer to:

Art and entertainment
 Dhruva (2002 film), a Kannada film starring Darshan
 Dhruva (2016 film), a Telugu film starring Ram Charan
 Dhruva (band), an Indian music band
 Dhruva Interactive, a video game studio in India
 Super Commando Dhruva, an Indian comic book superhero

People 
 Dhruva Dharavarsha, a medieval Rashtrakuta king of India
 Dhruva Sarja, Indian actor

Other uses
 Dhruva reactor, an Indian nuclear reactor

See also 
 Dhruv (disambiguation)